Randolph's Leap is an eight piece indie-pop band from Glasgow, Scotland, and signed to Lost Map Records as of 2014. Founded by frontman Adam Ross in 2006, members include Ross (guitar/vocals), Adam Florence (drums), Vicki Cole (bass), Andrew MacLellan (guitar), Heather Thikey (violin), Pete MacDonald (keyboards), Ali Hendry (trumpet) and Fraser Gibson (trombone).

The band has released regular EPs, singles, and LPs since 2010, with their official debut album Clumsy Knot released in 2014. Susan Le May of The Quietus wrote that "the album moves from whimsical, earnest folk romanticism to introspection and Casio-frilled irony," and that it "marks the arrival proper of the next generation of witty Scottish indie pop." The band tours frequently in the UK, having performed at festivals such as Howlin' Fling, Belladrum, Mugstock and The Fringe.

History

2006: Formation
Randolph's Leap were formed in 2006 when lead singer Adam Ross (originally from Nairn, Scotland) met Gareth Perrie (from Dunblane) at The University of the West of Scotland in Ayr. Around 2009 the band expanded to a six piece with the addition of Vicki Cole on bass (from Aberdeen, Scotland), Heather Thickey on violin (also from Aberdeen), Iain Taylor on drums (from Dumfries) and Andrew MacLellan on guitar and cello (from Crieff).

The band released their first EP, titled Battleships and Kettle Chips, on 15 November 2010 on Olive Grove Records. On 16 May 2011 they released a two-track single on Olive Grove as well, titled "Counting Sheep/Deep Blue Sea." In 2011 the live band expanded from a 6-piece to an 8-piece with the additions of Ali Hendry (trumpet) and Fraser Gibson (trombone).

2012-13: First albums

2012 saw the band greatly increase its output, and that year alone they released two full-length albums, three EPs, and the single "This Ain't It" via vinyl postcard. Their first LP came out on Peenko Records on 20 February 2012 and was titled The Curse of the Haunted Headphones. Peenko Records also released their EP As Fast As A Man that September, and in October 2012 the band released the EP Hermit on Fence Records. In 2013, Gareth Perrie left the band and was subsequently replaced by Pete MacDonald from the State Broadcasters. MacDonald had first hand knowledge of the band as he had helped produce their upcoming album Clumsy Knot in 2013.

In 2012 the band made the list of artists nominated for the Blog Sound of 2013 and in the same year they came 16th in the Hype Machine's UK Music Blog Zeitgeist which was announced on BBC 6Music. While working on their new album, the band signed to Lost Map Records which was formed following the dissolution of the band's former label Fence Records in 2013. Lost Map is based on the Isle of Eigg in Scotland.

2014: Clumsy Knot

The band's "first official" LP, titled Clumsy Knot, was released on 7 April 2014 on Lost Map Records. Several of the thirteen tracks are re-workings of songs from on their previous lo-fi recordings, and while approximately half of the songs were home-recorded, Alfred Archer of FolkRadio.co.uk wrote that the album "as a whole sees a marked step up in production from their previous work." Archer further called the album "thoughtful, funny and uplifting," while David Pollock of  The Scotsman gave similar praise, writing in a largely positive review that the album "is light of touch and cheerful of spirit." Susan Le May of The Quietus wrote that "the album moves from whimsical, earnest folk romanticism to introspection and Casio-frilled irony," and that it "marks the arrival proper of the next generation of witty Scottish indie pop."

While promoting the new album the band performed at several Scottish festivals in 2014, including Howlin' Fling on Eigg, Belladrum, and The Fringe. They also toured with other bands on the Lost Map label, including Kid Canaveral.

The band also released a video for the single, Weatherman, featuring former BBC weatherman Michael Fish.

2014: Singles, sessions

The band have recorded two sessions for Marc Riley's BBC 6Music show, plus two for BBC Radio Scotland, one for the Vic Galloway show and one for Tom Morton. They have recorded numerous sessions for local radio including Moray Firth Radio in Inverness, plus the Daily Record newspaper. In June 2014 the band made a live TV appearance on the Riverside Show on STV Glasgow. They were interviewed by the BBC in 2014, also performing another live session.

In June 2014 the band's single "I Can't Dance To This Music Anymore," first included on their old album The Curse of the Haunted Headphones, was released through Lost Map's postcard series of mail-order singles.  Clash Music called the song a "joyous folk-pop romp" and "deeply Scottish in its ability to turn melancholy into joy."

2016: Cowardly Deeds
The band's second album, titled Cowardly Deeds, was released on 20 May 2016 on Olive Grove Records.

2018: Worryingly Okay
The band's third album, titled Worryingly Okay, was released on 25 May 2018 on Lost Map Records.

2018 The Isle of Love Theatre Tour
The Isle of Love was a play by Right Lines Productions, written by Euan Martin and Dave Smith, directed by Mark Saunders and based on songs by Adam Ross. The Isle of Love was billed by its writers as a "bittersweet tale of love, loss, recovery and discovery". The play explored the beauty and restorative qualities of island life and why people choose to visit, to stay, to leave and to return. The production toured all over Scotland in the spring of 2018 and starred John Kielty, Deborah Arnott, Ross Allan, Amy McGregor and Kevin Lennon.

2018 The Isle of Love Compilation
In conjunction with the Isle of Love theatre tour, the band released a compilation album of the same name, containing 21 songs from the band's back catalogue.

2021 Spirit Level
The band's next studio album was Spirit Level in early 2021, released by Fika Recordings. The album was well received with The Scotsman giving it four stars and Is This Music saying that it is the best attempt yet at capturing the full band sound.

I Can't Dance To This Music events
The band also put on a semi-regular mini music festival called I Can't Dance To This Music. These are all day music events featuring a mixture of live music, comedy and poetry. Past events have been held in Glasgow at the Bowlers Bar, the Glad Cafe, the CCA, Maryhill Community Hall and the Classic Grand. The line ups have included the likes of Josie Long, Meursault, BMX Bandits, Withered Hand, Kathryn Joseph, James Yorkston, Kid Canaveral, the Spook School, Ette, Rise Kagona and the Jit Jive Band, the State Broadcasters, Skinny Dipper, Viking Moses, TeenCanteen, ballboy, Chrissy Barnacle, CARBS, Adam Stafford, eagleowl, Prehistoric Friends, Henry & Fleetwood, Spare Snare, Book Group and Life Model.

Style

According to FolkRadio.co.uk in 2014, "The band’s slightly ramshackle, whimsical, indie style, together with their Glasgow base, makes comparisons to Belle and Sebastian unavoidable, though, at times there are also hints of Camera Obscura, Polyphonic Spree and The Magnetic Fields. It is Ross’s lyrics, which manage to be both humorous and heartbreaking, that sets the band apart from these influences." About Ross's songwriting and vocals, The Quietus wrote that "The driving force and linchpin of the group, [Adam Ross] is a songwriter who is both honest and charming, combining the strut and humour of Neil Hannon, the sincerity, vulnerability and softness of Stuart Murdoch and the lyrical wit and musical playfulness of the DIY Daddy, King Creosote himself."

Members
Current
Adam Ross - guitar/vocals (2006–present)
Adam Armour-Florence - drums (2016–present)
Vicki Cole - bass (2009–present)
Andrew MacLellan - guitar, cello (2009–present)
Heather Thikey - violin (2009–present)
Ali Hendry - trumpet (2011–present)
Fraser Gibson - trombone (2011–present)
Pete MacDonald - keyboards (2013–present)
Past
Gareth Perrie - keyboards (2006-2013)
Iain Taylor - drums/guitar  (2009-2016)

Discography

Albums

EPs

Singles

Further reading
Interviews

Discographies
Randolph's Leap at AllMusic
Randolph's Leap at Discogs

See also
:Category:Musical groups from Glasgow

References

External links

RandolphsLeap.co.uk
Randolph's Leap on Facebook
Randolph's Leap on Twitter
Randolph's Leap on YouTube
Randolph's Leap on Bandcamp
Randolph's Leap on SoundCloud

Scottish pop music groups
British indie pop groups
Musical groups from Glasgow